This is a list of commercial recordings of Johann Sebastian Bach's The Art of Fugue.

 Without recording date – to be inserted in the list

References

Sources
 http://www.jsbach.org/1080.html
 http://www.bach-cantatas.com/NVD/BWV1080.htm#Rec

Discographies of compositions by J. S. Bach